Ar Rahaliyah (or Rahhaliyah, Rahaliya) is an Iraqi town in Al-Anbar Governorate, near the western shore of Lake Milh.

In 1921 Rahaliya, along with Shithathah, was noted for its "immense" groves for palm date production.

Archaeology
The Rahaliyah area is recognised for the remains of early Christian churches, some of which may have been erected as martyrions.

References

Rahaliyah